Central Catholic High School is a Roman Catholic high school in Grand Island, Nebraska, United States.  It is located in the Roman Catholic Diocese of Grand Island.

Background

Central Catholic was founded in 1956 and has since served the Grand Island area.  It began as a four-year high school for grades 9–12.  Grades seven and eight were added later to form a junior-senior high school.  In 1997, a $1-million building expansion was completed and sixth grade was added to the school.  Today, Central Catholic consists of a middle school for grades 6-8 and a high school for grades 9–12.

Central Catholic is fully accredited by the Nebraska Department of Education and North Central Association of Colleges & Schools.  All members of the administrative and teaching staff are certified by the State of Nebraska.

Central Catholic is primarily a college preparatory institution.  The school seeks to meet the needs of all students through a diversified curriculum.  At the middle school level, emphasis is placed on learning basic skills and exposing students to a wide variety of learning opportunities in a highly structured environment.  At the high school level, a broad range of courses are offered to meet the individual needs of students.  Religious instruction is an integral part of the curriculum for both middle school and high school students. To promote moral and spiritual development, Christian principles based upon Catholic tradition are incorporated into every phase of daily school life.

Athletics
Central Catholic is a member of the Nebraska School Activities Association and the Centennial Conference.  They have won the following NSAA State Championships:

 Boys' football - none (runner-up - 1976, 1979, 1983)
 Boys' baseball - none (runner-up - 1970)
 Girls' golf - 1999, 2000, 2012
 Boys' tennis - 1963, 1994, 1995, 1996, 1998, 2002
 Girls' volleyball - 1981, 1987, 1988, 1992, 1993, 1994, 2005, 2007 2010, 2019, 2022 (runner-up - 1982, 1984, 1995, 1996, 2002, 2006,2008, 2009, 2017)
 Boys' basketball - 2000, 2021 (runner-up - 2007, 2020, 2022)
 Boys' wrestling - 1982
 Boys' golf - 2002, 2003, 2004, 2015, 2016, 2018, 2019
 Girls' tennis - 1999, 2000, 2001
 Boys' track and field - 2004, 2022 (runner-up - 2021)
 Boys' chess - 2005

References

External links
 School website

 

Roman Catholic Diocese of Grand Island
Grand Island, Nebraska
Catholic secondary schools in Nebraska
Schools in Hall County, Nebraska
Educational institutions established in 1956
1956 establishments in Nebraska